Bond-South City was a census-designated place in Leon County, Florida during the 1950 and 1960 censuses, which consists of the communities of Bond and South City.

Population
The population in 1950 was 4,611. However, subsequent annexations by Tallahassee reduced the census area's population to 1,148 by 1960. Further expansion by Tallahassee in the 1960s absorbed the remainder of the CDP area.

Geography

The census area of Bond-South City was located south of Tallahassee and north of Woodville. The census area was home to Florida A & M University, which separated the communities. Adams and Monore Streets are the main north-south corridors of the area.

References

History of Tallahassee, Florida
Geography of Leon County, Florida
Former census-designated places in Florida